Irin Carmon (born 1983/1984) is an Israeli-American journalist and commentator. She is a senior correspondent at New York Magazine, and a CNN contributor. She is co-author of Notorious RBG: The Life and Times of Ruth Bader Ginsburg. Previously, she was a national reporter at MSNBC, covering women, politics, and culture for the website and on air. She was a visiting fellow in the Program for the Study of Reproductive Justice at Yale Law School.

In 2011, she was named one of Forbes''' "30 under 30"  in media and featured in New York Magazine as a face of young feminism. She received the November 2011 Sidney award from The Sidney Hillman Foundation recognizing her reporting on the Mississippi Personhood Initiative for Salon. Mediaite named her among four in its award for Best TV pundit of 2014.

 Early life 
Carmon is Jewish and was born in Israel, the granddaughter of Zionists who lived in Palestine during World War II. She grew up on Long Island. She is a naturalized citizen of the United States.

A graduate of Waldorf School of Garden City in 2001, Carmon attended Harvard College and graduated in 2005 with an AB in Literature, magna cum laude.

While at Harvard, Carmon wrote for The Harvard Crimson and the Let's Go series of travel guides. Her senior thesis was titled, "Genealogies of Catastrophe: Yehuda Amichai's Lo Me'Achshav, Lo Me'kan and Ricardo Piglia's Respiración artificial."

 Career 

Early in her career, Carmon wrote regularly for the Boston Globe, the Village Voice, and The Anniston Star. She was a media reporter for the fashion-industry trade journal Women's Wear Daily from 2006 to 2009.

Carmon was a Jezebel staff writer from 2009 to 2011. She wrote a post calling The Daily Show a "boys' club where women's contributions are often ignored and dismissed”, and opining that then-correspondent Olivia Munn was only hired on the show because of her status as a sex symbol. The women of the Daily Show responded by publishing an open letter defending their workplace. In response to allegations that she had failed to provide adequate time for comment, Carmon posted her email thread with the Daily Show publicist which took place one week before the story was published. Two years later, Carmon noted her appreciation for changes at The Daily Show since the controversy.

From 2011 to 2013, Carmon was a staff writer for Salon. Her Salon coverage of Eden Foods drew attention to the organic food company's lawsuit against the contraception mandate of the Affordable Care Act. Her piece was used in an Appeals Court ruling as evidence against Eden Foods' claim of a religious freedom motive. In October 2012, she and Jezebel founder Anna Holmes started the trending #sorryfeminists hashtag that mocked negative stereotypes of feminists.

In June 2013, Carmon was hired full-time by MSNBC. She has written for MSNBC.com and contributed on the shows The Reid Report, Melissa Harris-Perry, and All In with Chris Hayes. Mediaite named her in a four-way tie among the "Best TV Pundits" of 2014 for bringing "a comprehensive understanding to women's health and justice issues that goes beyond the usual talking points." In January 2015, New York Magazine reported that Carmon would be co-authoring the biography Notorious R.B.G.: The Life and Times of Ruth Bader Ginsburg with Shana Knizhnik, the creator of the Notorious R.B.G. blog.  The book was released in October 2015 and debuted at #7 on the New York Times Best Seller list. In February 2015, Carmon conducted an exclusive interview for MSNBC with Ruth Bader Ginsburg for The Rachel Maddow Show.

In late 2017 and early 2018, Carmon teamed up with the Washington Post'' to break the news of sexual harassment and assault allegations against Charlie Rose, as well as CBS’s knowledge of his conduct. That work won a 2018 Mirror Award from the Newhouse School at Syracuse University.

In July 2018, Carmon was hired by New York Magazine, as a senior correspondent. In November 2018, she was hired by CNN as a contributor.

Bibliography

References

External links
 Personal website
 

Year of birth missing (living people)
Living people
American feminists
Israeli emigrants to the United States
American women bloggers
American bloggers
Television personalities from New York City
Feminist bloggers
Harvard College alumni
Jewish feminists
Jewish American writers
Writers from New York City
People from Garden City, New York
21st-century American non-fiction writers
21st-century Israeli writers
Israeli feminists
Israeli women writers
Israeli bloggers
Israeli women bloggers
Israeli television presenters
Israeli women television presenters
American biographers
American women biographers
Israeli biographers
Israeli women biographers
MSNBC people
CNN people
The Harvard Crimson people
Naturalized citizens of the United States
21st-century American women writers
American women journalists
Israeli women journalists